Juan Ramón Sánchez Paredes (born September 1, 1952 in Izalco, Sonsonate) is a former Salvadorean professional footballer and currently manager of Chalatenango.

He is the father of former captain of El Salvador national football team Ramón Alfredo Sánchez, footballers Félix Sánchez and Dennis Sánchez.

Titles

References

1952 births
Living people
Salvadoran footballers
El Salvador international footballers
Salvadoran football managers
Association footballers not categorized by position